Body flex is a lack of rigidity in a motor vehicle's chassis. It is often something to be avoided by car manufacturers as higher levels of body flex is a sign of structural weakness, and means that the vehicle's suspension cannot work as efficiently - the body takes up some of the 'slack', rather than the parts of the car which were specifically designed for this purpose. A chassis that flexes may be prone to fatigue and further "softening" with use will eventually result in failure. Cars of a sporting nature are, therefore, often very 'stiff', while convertibles or cabriolets are not often considered to be good candidates for high-performance sports cars because of their lack of a rigid roof.

Although, for some time, body flex was a result of attempts to keep a car's weight down, makers such as Audi (the A8), and Jaguar (with the 2003 XJ8) have employed the use of aluminium in chassis production to get around this obstacle, ensuring the weight of these cars and their level of body flex can both be kept to a minimum.

Typically, the stiffness of the body is measured in torsion. The body is supported at the spring caps at the rear, and then a torque is applied to the front spring caps via a long beam and a fulcrum.

See also
 Flexibility (engineering)

References

Automotive engineering